is a passenger railway station located in the town of Tadotsu, Nakatado District, Kagawa Prefecture, Japan. It is operated by JR Shikoku and has the station number "Y13".

Lines
Kaiganji Station is served by the JR Shikoku Yosan Line and is located 36.5 km from the beginning of the line at Takamatsu. Dosan line local, Rapid Sunport, and Nanpū Relay services stop at the station. Dosan line local, Rapid Sunport, and Nanpū Relay services stop at the station. In addition, there are two trains a day running a local service on the Seto-Ōhashi Line which stop at the station.

Layout
The station, which is unstaffed, consists of an island platform serving two tracks. A station building serves as a waiting room with an automatic ticket vending machine. Access to the island platform is by means of a footbridge. A siding branches off on the side of platform 1.

Adjacent stations

History
At that time the station was operated by Japanese Government Railways, later becoming Japanese National Railways (JNR). With the privatization of JNR on 1 April 1987, control of the station passed to JR Shikoku.

Surrounding area
Kaigan-ji Temple 
Kaiganji Beach

See also
 List of railway stations in Japan

References

External links
Station timetable

Railway stations in Kagawa Prefecture
Railway stations in Japan opened in 1913
Tadotsu, Kagawa